The Coupe du Togo is the top knockout tournament of the Togolese football.

Winners

before independence
1955 : Essor (Lomé)
1956 : Etoile Filante de Lomé
1958 : Etoile Filante de Lomé

since independence
1961 : Etoile Filante de Lomé
unknown winners between 1962 and 1973
1974 : Omnisports (Atakpamé)
1975 : ASKO Kara (Kara)
1976 : ASKO Kara (Kara) 
1977 : Edan (Lomé)
1978 : No Cup
1979 : OC Agaza (Lomé)
1980 : AC Semassi F.C. (Sokodé)
1981 : OC Agaza (Lomé) 1-0 Aiglons (Lomé)
1982 : AC Semassi F.C. (Sokodé) 1-0 OC Agaza (Lomé)
1983 : No Cup
1984 : OC Agaza (Lomé) 0-0 (3 t.a.b. à 0) ASFOSA (Lomé)
1985 : Foadan FC (Dapaong) 1-0 Doumbé FC (Sansanné-Mango)
1986 : Entente 2 (Lomé) 2-0 ASKO Kara (Kara)
1987 : ASKO Kara (Kara)  2-1 AC Semassi FC (Sokodé)
1988 : OC Agaza (Lomé) 1-0 Ifodje Atakpamé (Atakpamé)
1989 : Entente 2 (Lomé) 1-0 Aiglons (Lomé)
1990 : AC Semassi F.C. (Sokodé) 2-1 Entente 2 (Lomé)
No cup between 1991 and 1993
1994 : Etoile Filante de Lomé 3-2 OC Agaza (Lomé)
1995 : ASKO Kara (Kara) 1-0 AC Semassi FC (Sokodé)
1996 : Doumbé F.C. (Sansanné-Mango) 2-1 Etoile Filante de Lomé
No cup between 1997 and 1998
1999 : OC Agaza (Lomé) 1-0 Entente 2 (Lomé)
2000 : unknown winner
2001 : Dynamic Togolais (Lomé) 3-0 Sara (Bafilo)
2002 : Dynamic Togolais (Lomé) 2-0 Doumbé FC (Sansanné-Mango) 
2003 : Maranatha F.C. (Fiokpo)
2004 : AS Douane (Lomé) 2-1 Foadan FC (Dapaong)
2005 : Dynamic Togolais (Lomé) 1-0 OC Agaza (Lomé)
2006 : AS Togo-Port (Lomé) 1-1 (5 t.a.b à 4) ASKO Kara

Coupe de l'Indépendance
2016 : US Koroki (Tchamba) 1-1 AS Togo-Port (Lomé) [5-3 pen]
2017 : AS Togo-Port (Lomé) 3-0 Maranatha F.C. (Fiokpo)
2018 : Gomido FC (Kpalimé) 3-0 US Koroki (Tchamba)
2019 : ASKO Kara (Kara)  3-1 Ifodjè FC (Atakpamé)

Coupe Nationale
2018 : Gomido FC''' (Kpalimé) 3-0 Dynamic Togolais (Lomé)
2019 : non jouée

References

External links
Togo - List of Cup Winners, RSSSF.com

Football competitions in Togo
Togolese